Kenneth Charles Freeman  (born 27 August 1940) is an Australian astronomer and astrophysicist who is currently Duffield Professor of Astronomy in the Research School of Astronomy and Astrophysics at the Mount Stromlo Observatory of the Australian National University in Canberra. He was born in Perth, Western Australia in 1940, studied mathematics and physics at the University of Western Australia, and graduated with first class honours in applied mathematics in 1962. He then went to Cambridge University for postgraduate work in theoretical astrophysics with Leon Mestel and Donald Lynden-Bell, and completed his doctorate in 1965. Following a postdoctoral appointment at the University of Texas with Gérard de Vaucouleurs, and a research fellowship at Trinity College, Cambridge, he returned to Australia in 1967 as a Queen Elizabeth Fellow at Mount Stromlo. Apart from a year in the Kapteyn Institute in Groningen in 1976 and some occasional absences overseas, he has been at Mount Stromlo ever since.

His research interests are in the formation and dynamics of galaxies and globular clusters, and he is particularly interested in the problem of dark matter in galaxies: he was one of the first to point out that spiral galaxies contain a large fraction of dark matter. He regularly visits the Space Telescope Science Institute as Distinguished Visiting Scientist.

He is very active in supporting graduate students and has acted as primary supervisor for 60 PhD students and 12 postdocs. He currently supervises Stephanie Monty on globular cluster populations in the Milky Way. Five of his students have won Hubble Fellowships. He is active in international astronomy, as a division past-president of the International Astronomical Union, and serves on visiting committees for several major astronomical institutions around the world. He has been an invited speaker at 154 international conferences since 1969. He has co-authored a book on dark matter.

Appointments and honours 

1972 Pawsey Medal of the Australian Academy of Science
1981 Fellow of the Australian Academy of Science
1990 Aaronson Lecturer at the University of Arizona
1993 Distinguished Achievement Award, University of California Institutes
1994 Oort Professor at Leiden University
1997 Visiting fellow at Merton College, Oxford
1998 Elected a Fellow of the Royal Society of London
1999 Dannie Heineman Prize for Astrophysics of the American Institute of Physics and the American Astronomical Society
2001 Tinsley Professor at the University of Texas
2001 Bishop Lecturer at Columbia University
2001 Named by ISI as one of Australia's 35 most highly cited scientists (ranked number 5)
2001 Gave the Robert Ellery Lecture for the Astronomical Society of Australia
2002 Associate of the Royal Astronomical Society in 2002
2003 Blaauw professor at the University of Groningen
2003 Centenary Medal from the Australian Government
2004 Antoinette de Vaucouleurs Lecture and Medal at the University of Texas
 2008 Johann Wempe Award, Astrophysical Institute Potsdam
2012 Prime Minister's Prize for Science
2013 Matthew Flinders Medal and Lecture (Australian Academy of Science)
2013 Henry Norris Russell Lectureship (American Astronomical Society)
2014 Gruber Prize in Cosmology (jointly with Jaan Einasto, Brent Tully and Sidney van den Bergh) from the Gruber Foundation
2014 Peter Baume Award of The Australian National University
2016 Dirac Medal, University of New South Wales
2017 United States National Academy of Sciences, Foreign Associate
2017 Companion of the Order of Australia
2020 Elected a Legacy Fellow of the American Astronomical Society

References

1940 births
Living people
20th-century Australian astronomers
21st-century Australian astronomers
Fellows of the Royal Society
Fellows of the Australian Academy of Science
University of Western Australia alumni
Academic staff of the Australian National University
Recipients of the Centenary Medal
Winners of the Dannie Heineman Prize for Astrophysics
Companions of the Order of Australia
Foreign associates of the National Academy of Sciences
Fellows of the American Astronomical Society